Strode is a surname. Notable people with the surname include:

Andre Strode (born 1972), American player of gridiron football
Aubrey E. Strode (1873–1946), American lawyer and politician
Bill Strode (1937–2006), an American photographer
Blake Strode (born 1987), American tennis player
Charles Strode (born 1957), former professional tennis player from the United States
Duffey Strode, American child preacher 
Haley Strode (born 1987), American actress
Hudson Strode (1892–1976), an author and professor of creative writing at the University of Alabama
James M. Strode (fl. 1827–1848), militia officer and politician from the U.S. state of Illinois
Jesse Burr Strode (1845–1924), Nebraska Republican politician
Jez Strode (born 1958), drummer for the British pop band Kajagoogoo
Lester Strode (born 1958), bullpen coach for the Chicago Cubs
Morris Skip Strode (born 1960), American tennis player
Ralph Strode (fl. 1350–1400), an English schoolman and writer
Richard Strode (disambiguation), various people
William Strode (1598–1645), English politician
William Strode (disambiguation), various people
Woody Strode (1914–1994), African-American decathlete, football star and actor

Fictional
The surname "Strode" has been used in fiction. This includes:

Laurie Strode, a character in the Halloween film series. She first appeared in Halloween.

See also
Alfred Rowland Chetham-Strode (1823–1890), New Zealand colonial public servant and politician
Warren Chetham-Strode (1896–1974), English author and playwright